"Mi Nuevo Vicio" is a song by Mexican singer Paulina Rubio, featuring Morat, a Colombian band. It was released on 27 January 2015 by Universal Music Spain, and was later included on the track list of her eleventh studio album, Deseo (2018). The song was written by Juan Pablo Isaza, Juan Pablo Villamil, Simón Vargas, Alejandro Posada and Mauricio Rengifo, and produced by Sky Adams, Carlos Paucar and Rengifo. Musically, "Mi Nuevo Vicio" is a departure from her usual latin pop sound, and adapts to Colombian rumba with elements of rock pop. Lyrically, this talks about how genuine feelings develop during a love affair.

"Mi Nuevo Vicio" received critical acclaim from music critics, many whom praised the song's production. Commercially, the track reached number one in Mexico and Spain and the top ten in regions such as Latin America and Dominican Republic. It also appeared on the US Latin Airplay. Additionally, the song was certified double platinum by the Productores de Música de España for sales exceeding 80,000 units, and gold by the Asociación Mexicana de Productores de Fonogramas y Videogramas for 30,000 units.

The music video features Rubio dancing in a club with her love interest and then waking up with him in bed, over and over again. She also sings on a stage with Morat. To promote the single, Rubio performed the song at several gigs and shows including La Noche De Cadena 100, La Voz Spain, the Tu Mundo Awards, Telehit Awards, and on her Deseo tour.

Music video
The music video for "Mi Nuevo Vicio" premiered on Rubio's channel on YouTube and VEVO. In the video, she can be seen rocking out with Morat in a packed club, then she routinely finds herself in the bed of a handsome man (played by Brazilian model Andre Costa) every morning afterword.

A review by Billboard staff described the Rubio's music video role as player "with boys who are younger, but not necessarily better, for her", and compared her to Anne Bancroft in the 1967 film The Graduate, where the American actress plays the role of Mrs. Robinson.

Track listing 
Digital download
 "Mi Nuevo Vicio" -

Charts

Weekly charts

Year-end charts

Certifications

References 

2015 singles
Paulina Rubio songs
Spanish-language songs
Universal Music Latino singles
2014 songs
Number-one singles in Spain
Songs written by Mauricio Rengifo